Saulgé-l'Hôpital is a former commune in the Maine-et-Loire department in western France. On 15 December 2016, it was merged into the new commune Brissac Loire Aubance.

See also
Communes of the Maine-et-Loire department

References

Saulgelhopital